Gagetown can refer to:

 Gagetown, New Brunswick, a historic village and shire town of Queens County, New Brunswick, Canada
 CFB Gagetown, a Canadian military base located in southwestern New Brunswick
 Gagetown (film), a feature-length documentary film about the chemical defoliant spray program that took place at CFB Gagetown from 1956 to 1984
 Gagetown Parish, New Brunswick
 Gagetown, Michigan, a village in the United States